The Cheval Mallet (or Malet, meaning Mallet Horse) describes a fabulous and evil horse mentioned in folklore around the French Vendée, Poitou, and more frequently in the Pays de Retz, near Lac de Grand Lieu. It was supposed to appear at night or in the middle of the night as a beautiful white or black horse, saddled and bridled, and tempt travelers exhausted by a long journey. Several legends about the unwary who rode this horse, and never returned unless you have them on the price of travel or protection spell as a medal of St. Benedict.
A feast was also known as horse Merlette, Merlet or Mallet in the town of Saint-Lumine-de-Coutais, it had a military function, cathartic celebration of renewal or carnival, and featured several actors around one oak, one disguised as a horse. It was opposed by the ecclesiastical authorities and banned in 1791.

External links
  Cheval Mallet

References

  Paul Guérin, Archives historiques du Poitou, Impr. de H. Oudin, 1893, vol. 24 online text

French legendary creatures
Horses in mythology
French folklore